Fabien Fabiano (1882, Lamballe – 1962), pseudonym of Jules Coup de Fréjac, was a French illustrator, portrait painter, and designer. He was descended from a family of sailors and privateers in Brittany, spending his childhood in the small port of Dahouët. He studied in Saint-Servan and then did his military service in Saint-Malo before moving to Paris in 1900. He was married to Nadine Khouzan who was a pianist virtuoso. He attended the preparatory workshop of École des Beaux-Arts, and the Académie Colarossi and took lessons with Alphonse Mucha. His early illustrations were published in major magazines such as the New-York Tribune, La Vie Parisienne, and Fantasio. He traveled frequently and painted the portraits of society members, famous artists of the Golden Age of Hollywood, and political figures.

References 

1882 births
1962 deaths
People from Lamballe
French illustrators
French erotic artists
20th-century French painters
20th-century French male artists
French male painters
École des Beaux-Arts alumni
Académie Colarossi alumni